The Royalton raid was a British-led Indian raid in 1780 against various towns along the White River Valley in the Vermont Republic, and was part of the American Revolutionary War. It was the last major Indian raid in New England.

Raids
In the early morning hours of October 16, 1780, Lieutenant Houghton of the British Army's 53rd Regiment of Foot and a single Grenadier, along with 300 Mohawk warriors from the Kahnawake Reserve in the British province of Quebec, attacked and burned the towns of Royalton, Sharon and Tunbridge along the White River in eastern Vermont. This raid was launched in conjunction with other raids led by Major Christopher Carleton of the 29th Regiment of Foot along the shores of Lake Champlain and Lake George and Sir John Johnson of the King's Royal Regiment of New York in the Mohawk River valley. Four Vermont settlers were killed and twenty six were taken prisoner to Quebec.

By the time the local militia could assemble, Houghton and his command were already on their way back north. The militia caught up with the raiders near Randolph, Vermont, and a few volleys were fired back and forth, but when Houghton said that the remaining captives might be killed by the Mohawks if fighting continued, the local militia let the raiders slip away. A plaque at the East Randolph cemetery marks the site of this event.

The Hannah Handy (Hendee) monument, on the South Royalton town green, is a granite arch honoring a young mother who lost her young son in the raid, crossed the river, and successfully begged for the return of several children. With the assistance of one of the Mohawks, she caught up with the British and Mohawk party and pleaded with Lieutenant Houghton to release the young boys now being held by the Indians, partly appealing as a mother of one of the captives and partly by arguing that they wouldn't survive the trip to Canada and stating that their deaths would be on his hands. The British leader ordered the boys released to the woman for safe return to their families. The names of the boys she saved were: Michael Hendee, Roswell Parkhurst, son of Capt. Ebenezer Parkhurst, Andrew and Sheldon Durkee, Joseph Rix, Rufus and ___ Fish, Nathaniel Evans and Daniel Downer.

References

1780 in the United States
Conflicts in 1780
Battles in the Northern theater of the American Revolutionary War after Saratoga
Battles involving Native Americans
Battles involving Great Britain
Randolph, Vermont
Royalton, Vermont
Sharon, Vermont
Tunbridge, Vermont
Military raids
Pre-statehood history of Vermont
Battles of the American Revolutionary War in Vermont